Carron fort  is a ringfort (rath) and National Monument located in County Tipperary, Ireland.

Location

Carron fort is located 1.6 km (1 mile) east of Limerick Junction.

Description

Carron fort is a trivallate rath.

References

Archaeological sites in County Tipperary
National Monuments in County Tipperary